Marko Kovjenić (born 2 February 1993) is a Slovenian football midfielder who plays for Radomlje.

References

External links
PrvaLiga profile 

1993 births
Living people
Footballers from Ljubljana
Slovenian footballers
Association football midfielders
Slovenian PrvaLiga players
Slovenian Second League players
NK Domžale players
FC ViOn Zlaté Moravce players
NK Radomlje players
Slovak Super Liga players
Slovenian expatriate footballers
Slovenian expatriate sportspeople in Slovakia
Expatriate footballers in Slovakia
Slovenia under-21 international footballers
Slovenia youth international footballers